Kottalagi is a village in the southern state of Karnataka, India. It is located in the Athani taluk of Belagavi district in Karnataka.

Demographics
At the 2001 India census, Kottalgi had a population of 5737 with 2946 males and 2791 females.

See also
 Belgaum
 Districts of Karnataka

References

External links
 http://Belgaum.nic.in/

Villages in Belagavi district